The CANT 26 was an Italian two-seat biplane trainer built by CANT.

Design and development
The CANT 26 was an unusual product of CANT as it was a landplane. It was a two-seat biplane with tailwheel landing gear and powered by a 60 kW (80 hp) engine. Only seven examples were built, one of which competed in the Challenge 1929 trials, and another of which was temporarily converted into a seaplane. One plane was registered in Argentina as R-183 and it was later sold to an Italian citizen resident in Paraguay, Nicola Bo in 1932. He sold it to the Paraguayan Military Air Arm. It received the serial T-6 and it was used as a liaison aircraft during the Chaco War. It was destroyed in a fatal accident during the war on May 5, 1933, killing Capt. José D. Jara (pilot) and Lt. Niemann (passenger).

Operators

Paraguayan Air Force

Specifications

References

Further reading
The Illustrated Encyclopedia of Aircraft (Part Work 1982-1985), 1985, Orbis Publishing
 Sapienza Fracchia, Antonio Luis: "La Contribución Italiana en la Aviación Paraguaya". Author's edition. Asunción, 2007. 300pp.

External links

aerei-italiani.net

CANT 26
1920s Italian civil trainer aircraft
Biplanes
Single-engined tractor aircraft
Aircraft first flown in 1928